Cuco may refer to:

 Cuco (folklore), a ghost-monster in folklore
 Cuco (musician), an American singer-songwriter
 Cuco (construction), a type of dry stone construction used in Valencia, Spain

See also 
Cuca (disambiguation)